Monroe Township is one of fourteen townships in Morgan County, Indiana, United States. As of the 2010 census, its population was 4,904 and it contained 1,917 housing units.

History
The Lake Ditch Bridge was listed on the National Register of Historic Places in 2001.

Geography

Cities, towns, villages
 Monrovia

Unincorporated towns
 Allman at 
 Bunker Hill at 
 Gasburg at 
 Lake Hart at 
(This list is based on USGS data and may include former settlements.)

Cemeteries
The township contains these two cemeteries: Bethesda and North Branch.

Major highways
  Interstate 70

Airports and landing strips
 Berling Airport

Lakes
 Echo Lake
 Hart Lake

School districts
 Monroe-Gregg School District

Political districts
 Indiana's 4th congressional district
 State House District 47
 State Senate District 37

References
 
 United States Census Bureau 2008 TIGER/Line Shapefiles
 IndianaMap

External links
 Indiana Township Association
 United Township Association of Indiana
 City-Data.com page for Monroe Township

Townships in Morgan County, Indiana
Townships in Indiana